Ken Flach and Robert Seguso were the defending champions, but Seguso did not participate this year.  Flach partnered Paul Annacone, losing in the first round.

Mike De Palmer and Gary Donnelly won the title, defeating Andrés Gómez and Ivan Lendl 6–3, 7–5 in the final.

Seeds

  Paul Annacone /  Ken Flach (first round)
  Andrés Gómez /  Ivan Lendl (final)
  Scott Davis /  David Pate (quarterfinals)
  Mike De Palmer /  Gary Donnelly (champions)

Draw

Draw

External links
Draw

Tokyo Indoor
1986 Grand Prix (tennis)